Goderich Airport , also known as Goderich Municipal Airport, is a registered aerodrome located  north of Goderich, Ontario, Canada.

The airport is classified as an airport of entry by Nav Canada and is staffed by the Canada Border Services Agency on a call-out basis from the Region of Waterloo International Airport on weekdays and the John C. Munro Hamilton International Airport on weekends. CBSA officers at this airport currently can handle general aviation aircraft only, with no more than 15 passengers.

History
During World War II, Goderich Airport hosted No. 12 Elementary Flying Training School (EFTS) for the British Commonwealth Air Training Plan, providing initial pilot training for aircrews using the Fleet Finch. Like most of the other EFTS, this school was run by a civilian flying club, in this case, the school was operated by the Kitchener-Waterloo and the County of Huron Flying Clubs. No. 12 EFTS opened on October 14, 1940 and closed on July 14, 1944.

The Canadian Sport Parachuting Association (CSPA) notes on its 'History' page that in 1991, "The largest Canadian Freefall formation was established with a 44-way in Goderich, Ontario." As of June 2020, this is still the Canadian record.

Aerodrome information 
The runway data lists a "turf - all way field - 3200'."

References

External links
Goderich Municipal Airport (official site)
Goderich Municipal / Skyharbour Airport on COPA's Places to Fly airport directory

Registered aerodromes in Ontario
Airports of the British Commonwealth Air Training Plan
Transport in Huron County, Ontario
Transport in Goderich, Ontario
Buildings and structures in Huron County, Ontario